This is a list of adult fiction books that topped The New York Times Fiction Best Seller list in 1947. Only six books topped the list that year. The most popular titles were Gentlemen's Agreement (14 weeks) and House Divided, which spent much of the last quarter of the year at the top of the list and a total of 15 weeks at the top overall. Two other novels, Lydia Bailey and The Moneymen each spent 12 weeks at the top. Sinclair Lewis had his only No. 1 bestseller that year (at least since the list went national in 1942).

See also
 Publishers Weekly list of bestselling novels in the United States in the 1940s

References

1947
.
1947 in the United States